The River Carron is an east coast river in Sutherland, in the Highlands of Scotland.

It begins as Abhainn a' Ghlinne Mhòir, which joins with the Alladale River (Scottish Gaelic: Abhainn Alladail) to form the River Carron. Further downstream, tributaries include the Water of Glencalvie and the Black Water.
The River Carron flows down through Strathcarron, then into the Kyle of Sutherland near Bonar Bridge.

The River Carron is used for kayaking and salmon fishing.

References

River Carron - UK Rivers Guidebook

Carron
Landforms of Sutherland